Located in the region of Colombia and Ecuador, the Awa or Awa Pit speaking people is an indigenous group settled between the Andes Mountains and the Western Coast. Awa Pit or otherwise known as Cuaiquer (Coaiquer, Cuayquer, Kwaiker, Kwayquer, etc.), in both group and name, is classified as part of the Barbacoan language. Another term that this group goes by is the "Inkal Awa" or "the mountain people", to distinguish themselves from other indigenous groups within that region.Awa pit is classified by UNESCO as a severely endangered language. The Awa pit language has a subject–object–verb structure and has adopted the Latin script. Grammatically, Awa pit uses a characteristic conjunct/disjunct system of verb suffixes for person-marking which displays similarities with some Tibeto-Burman languages, such as the Newari language of Kathmandu.

Speakers and characteristics
The Awa pit language has around 21 thousand speakers, mostly residing on the Colombian Pacific slopes of the Andes, with about a thousand in an adjacent area of Ecuador. The Awa Pit language is spoken less and less each year. In a study done in 2008 there were about 12,000 Awa Pit speakers, but as of 2011 there are about 2,100 speakers left in the provinces of northern Ecuador. Most Awa women are monolingual to the Awa Pit language, while some men can speak both Spanish and Awa Pit and a very few of these Awa Pit speakers can both read and write the language. Literacy among Awa speakers is less than 1% in their native language and under 5% in the secondary Spanish language. The Awa people are mostly farmers. Their crops include plantains, corn, sugarcane, and beans. Many of the Awa do not live near each other, they live in scattered settlements often 2-3 kilometers apart, and often move depending on the planting and harvesting seasons.

Phonology 

The Awa Pit inventory is as follows:

Consonants 

 Some dialects can also have phonemic retroflex sounds , 
 Geminated consonants are noted as [pː, t̪ː, kː].
 [ɲ] is the main sound of the consonant sequence /nj/
 In word-final positions, there are two realizations for each stop consonant; unreleased [p̚, t̪̚, k̚], or post nasal [pᵐ, t̪ⁿ̪, kᵑ].

Vowels

Word Forms 
Possessive Word Forms

Possessive word formations in Awa Pit can be used to decipher or specify a certain kind of function or occurrence. These range from location-object, material-object, whole-parts of something, and definitions very reminiscent of English prepositions. This is partly because of the usage of ‘relational nouns’. Possession seems to be the main connection that these functions have and in the case of Awa Pit, the postposition pa is a known marker or using possessive adjectives is another way. It is also explained that “In some cases, however, there is an alternation between a possessive postposition with pa, a possessive adjective, and a bare noun modifier, where the bare noun acting as a modifier must occur directly before the noun it modifies [...] the alternation between these constructions can be seen to depend on humanness and referentiality”. This means that if a modifying noun is labelled human and referential then a postpositional word form is utilized. A possessive adjective is used instead if the non-head part is considered pronominal.

Examples

“Ideas of alienable possession and kinship relations necessarily involve the use of the postpositional or possessive adjective constructions (with the exception of “plural possessive adjectives”), rather than a bare noun modifier”

Alienable possession and kinship are basically referencing humans but there are a few cases where possession are fluid enough to contain higher animals therefore treating it like as if it was human (Awa Pit ‘personifies it in question’).

Plural Possessive Adjectives

Singular possessive adjectives happen in the assumed slot and descriptive adjectives happen between the possessive adjective and the main head noun itself:

There are no specific plural possessive adjective constructions because “In order to translate a phrase such as our house, speakers of Awa Pit have two options: the more common option is to simply use the singular possessive adjective:”

There is another option and that is to use the plural subject pronoun (unmalleable) into the bare noun modifier: (no adjectives can get between the pronoun and the subsequent noun)

Alienable Possession and Kinship Relations

Non-head nominal is considered referential and human, and the involvement of pa or a possessive adjective is needed.  Kinship relations are similar to alienable possession but is different when it comes to body-part possession because the non-head noun is not considered human nor referential. Essentially in Awa Pit, there is no difference between alienable and inalienable possession in an NP. That is due to the fact that different forms are reserved for referential human possession no matter the possession's nature.

Whole-Part

Part whole relations are incorporated in the same fashion as possession in Awa Pit. In this case, the whole acts as a modifier while the part acts as the head noun. The modifier whole could be a referential human and that means that the formation with pa or a possessive adjective are utilized. Non-referential human or non-humans traced with bare-nouns are likely to be used as well. It is also worth mentioning that Awa Pit is a Barbacoa language that specializes in placing part-whole relationships with a bare noun or a ‘genitive marker’.

Inflections

In terms of tense inflections, there are formal markers when referring to the past and the future in Awa Pit, and there is also an extra subtle category that helps express the present. Basically, if a marker for the past or future does not display itself in a sentence, then the string of inflections most likely represents the present. It is worth saying that the present is marked by a zero morpheme in a ‘pure structuralist form’, since tense markers happen after mood suffixes just before any person markers can appear.

There are also mood inflections that display a variety of meanings and discover a less cooperative group than the rest in semantically and syntactically manners. The mood marker na is only utilized for past counterfactual clauses such as before tense marking and after person marking. An s would be used for Locutor while an unmarked form would go for the Non-Locutor. Negation and interrogation inflections are only used for content question forms or by going through auxiliary verbs. The inflectional marker ma is considered both a negative inflectional marker and a ‘homophonous interrogative marker’ at the same time.

Sentence Structure 
Parts of Speech: noun, pronoun, adjective, verbs, post-positions, adverbs, interjections, discourse particles

AOV/SV organization

A=transitive subject, O=transitive object, V=verb, SV=serial verb marker, ACC=accusative

Constituent order 

Temporal adjuncts-when, how long, or how frequent the action happened

Locational adjuncts-where the action happened

Circumstantial adjuncts-adds information about the action

Non-subject complements-

Manner adverbials- tell how something happens (happily, tragically, simply, gently, etc.)

Noun Phrase Construction

Word Classes

Noun Phrase

Noun Phrase

Noun Phrase (past)

Plural Possessive adjectives 

-a speaker can use singular form or the plural subject pronoun

Noun Phrase

(next two examples) shows Unmarked nature of S and A, and the division of O between referential human (accusatory) and other (unmarked)

Transitive Verbs

Ditransitive Verbs

Postpositional Phrase

Causative

Semblative postposition

References

External links
"Cuaiquer Indian Language (Awa Pit, Awa-Cuaiquer)" – Native-Languages.org
"Gramática pedagógica del Awapit" (A learner's grammar of Awapit) –  direct download link to Microsoft Word document in Spanish, available from here (via Sasiku Project)

Languages of Colombia
Languages of Ecuador
Barbacoan languages